The Daniel B. Meginniss Plantation was a forced-labor farm of  located in Leon County, Florida, United States established by Daniel B. Meginniss. In 1860, 70 enslaved people worked the land, which was primarily devoted to producing cotton as a cash crop.

Plantation specifics
The Leon County Florida 1860 Agricultural Census shows that the Meginniss Plantation had the following:
 Improved Land: 
 Unimproved Land: 
 Cash value of plantation: $40,000
 Cash value of farm implements/machinery: $500
 Cash value of farm animals: $4150
 Number of slaves: 70
 Bushels of corn: 3000
 Bales of cotton: 150

The owner
Daniel B. Meginniss was born in 1820 in Maryland. Meginniss is shown as a voter in the First Florida Election in 1845.
1845 voters
1860 plantations
Paisley, Clifton; From Cotton To Quail, University of Florida Press, c1968.

Plantations in Leon County, Florida
Cotton plantations in Florida